Flirting with Death is a 1917 American silent comedy film directed by Elmer Clifton and starring Herbert Rawlinson, Agnes Vernon and Frank MacQuarrie.

Cast
 Herbert Rawlinson as 'Sky High' Billy Wardwell
 Agnes Vernon as Jane Higginbotham 
 Frank MacQuarrie as 'Domino' Dominick
 Mark Fenton as Dave Higginbotham
 Doc Crane as Ed Warmbath
 Fred Unger as Murphy

References

Bibliography
James Robert Parish & Michael R. Pitts. Film directors: a guide to their American films. Scarecrow Press, 1974.

External links
 

1917 films
1917 comedy films
1910s English-language films
American silent feature films
Silent American comedy films
American black-and-white films
Universal Pictures films
Films directed by Elmer Clifton
1910s American films